Alexander Huchel is a former German curler.

He is a former European men's curling champion.

Teams

References

External links
 

Living people
German male curlers
European curling champions

Year of birth missing (living people)
20th-century German people